Chryseofusus acherusius is a species of sea snail, a marine gastropod mollusk in the family Fasciolariidae, the spindle snails, the tulip snails and their allies.

Description
The length of the shell attains 58.2 mm.

Distribution
This marine species occurs off Madagascar and Mozambique.

References

 Hadorn R. & Fraussen K. (2003) The deep-water Indo-Pacific radiation of Fusinus (Chryseofusus subgen. nov.) (Gastropoda: Fasciolariidae). Iberus 21(1): 207–240.

External links

Fasciolariidae
Gastropods described in 2003